Nicos & Socratis Erimis is a Cypriot football club based in Erimi, Limassol. The club was founded in 1956. Since 2013 the club competes in the Cypriot Second Division. The club colors are yellow and black.

History
In 2009, the club won its promotion to a national division from the amateur League of STOK moving into Cypriot Fourth Division. In the final the club lost 2–1 at extra time against Constantios & Evripidis Trachoni.

Stadium
The team's home ground is Erimi Community Stadium of 1000 capacity.

League history
The following table shows the progress of the team in time (for those seasons found data).

References

External links
 Official website
 CFA profile
 Soccerway profile

Football clubs in Cyprus
Association football clubs established in 1956
1956 establishments in Cyprus